Metropolitan District Commission may refer to:
Metropolitan District Commission of Connecticut
Massachusetts Water Resources Authority (one of two successor agencies for Metropolitan District Commission of Massachusetts)
Department of Conservation and Recreation (one of two successor agencies for Metropolitan District Commission of Massachusetts)